William J. Graney (May 5, 1858 – May 26, 1913) was an American politician from New York.

Life
He was born on May 5, 1858, in Dobbs Ferry, Westchester County, New York. He attended the public schools, and graduated from Dobbs Ferry High School. Then he became a bookkeeper. Later he managed the Hatch Lithographing Company. He entered politics as a Democrat.

He was Register of Westchester County from 1893 to 1895. In 1893, he married Mary Louise Maher (died 1897).

Graney was a member of the New York State Assembly (Westchester Co., 2nd D.) in 1898; and a member of the New York State Senate (22nd D.) in 1899 and 1900.

He was again Register of Westchester County at the time of his death. He died on May 26, 1913, at his home at 33 Radford Street in Yonkers, New York, from "a complication of diseases".

Sources

1858 births
1913 deaths
Democratic Party New York (state) state senators
People from Yonkers, New York
Democratic Party members of the New York State Assembly
19th-century American politicians